Zeynep Tedü (born 22 October 1943) is a Turkish theater and film actress.

Background 
Zeynep Tedü was born on 22 October 1943 in Istanbul. She attended the Milan Theater School in Italy. She started her professional theater career in 1964 with the play "Boulevard" at Dormen Theater. In 1965 she started acting in cinema as well as theater, with the film "Bozuk Düzen" which was chosen as the "Best Film" at the Antalya Golden Orange Film Festival.

Filmography 
 Bugünün Saraylısı - 1985 
 Çileli Dünya - 1972 
 Ömrümce Unutamadım- Ömrümce Aradım - 1971 
 Beklenen Şarkı - 1971 
 Afacan - 1970 
 Kalbimin Efendisi - 1970 
 Merhamet - 1970 
 Mağrur Kadın - 1970 
 Acımak - 1970 
 Zindandan Gelen Mektup - 1970 
 Seven Ne Yapmaz - 1970 
 Bülbül Yuvası - 1970 
 İki Yetime - 1969 
 Ölüme Giden Yol - 1969
 Aşk Eski Bir Yalan - 1968 
 Bozuk Düzen - 1965

References

External links
 

1943 births
Living people
Turkish film actresses
20th-century Turkish actresses